Theo Vonk (born 16 December 1947) is a Dutch former football player and manager, most recently in charge of Gibraltar Premier Division side Glacis United, where he also served as technical director.

Career
Vonk was born in Uitgeest. He spent the majority of his playing career at AZ'67, playing for them as a central defender for ten years from 1968 to 1978, before spending a year at FC Volendam and subsequently retiring.

After retiring from playing, he joined his boyhood club AZ'67 as assistant manager, spending five years at the club before moving to Sparta Rotterdam in 1984. After a successful two years at the club, during which he guided them to 4th in his first season, he moved to FC Twente, finishing third three times over six years. A disastrous spell in Spain with Real Burgos followed in 1992, after which he became something of a journeyman manager, aside from three years in charge of AZ. Five years after leaving his last job at Sportclub Enschede, he joined Glacis United as manager and technical director. He left the club on 10 August 2018 due to personal reasons.

Personal life
Theo Vonk is the father of Michel Vonk, who notably played for AZ and Manchester City during his playing career. In 2013, while in his second spell at Enschede, he suffered a stroke.

Honours

As a player
AZ'67
KNVB Cup: 1977–78

As a manager
AZ'67/AZ
Eredivisie: 1980–81*
Eerste Divisie: 1995–96
KNVB Cup: 1980–81*, 1981–82*
UEFA Cup runner-up: 1980–81*
(* as assistant manager)

References

External links
  Profiel Theo Vonk op www.sparta-rotterdam.nl
  Profiel en statistieken van Theo Vonk op rodajcspelers.nl

Living people
1947 births
People from Uitgeest
Dutch footballers
Association football defenders
FC Volendam players
AZ Alkmaar players
AZ Alkmaar managers
Sparta Rotterdam managers
FC Twente managers
FC Groningen managers
Roda JC Kerkrade managers
Heracles Almelo managers
Dutch football managers
Real Burgos CF managers
Footballers from North Holland